Playa El Tarajal is a beach of Ceuta, bordering northern Morocco. The beach is about 250 metres in length with an average width of about 15 metres.

The beach is at the southern tip of Ceuta where the N13 coastal road leaves for Morocco.

References

Beaches of Ceuta